Léon Bollack (1859 – 1925) was a French trader who invented Bolak, a constructed language that also went by the name "the Blue Language", in 1899.

Personal
His parents were Hermann Bollack and Rachel Léontine Léon (daughter of Moise Léon, founder of the synagogue Buffault in Paris, and Henriette Vissier). The father was from Kreuznach in Rhineland-Palatinate, Germany, where the family name had been present "for centuries". The mother was from Paris.

Together with his wife Amelie Picard (daughter of Alphonse Mayer Picard and Sara Levy), he had three children: Léontine Rachel Alice (~1891-1981), Lucien Armand Bollack (1892 – 1968), who became an engineer, and a second daughter, Fanny Louise Bollack (1898 – 1958).

He died on September 23, 1925. His daughter, Léontine, changed her name to Alice and married Roger-Angel Olchanski. Together they had two sons, Jean and Daniel, although it was reported that the second son was born as a result of an affair with Alex Virot, a sports journalist..

His son, Lucien Armand Bollack went and founded the Bollack Netter & Co car company.

Léon Bollack, his wife Amélie and his daughter Fanny are buried in the Montmartre cemetery in Paris (3rd division).

New international languages
After a few years promoting Bolak, he abandoned the struggle in 1907 in favour of the movement backing Ido (a reformed version of the Esperanto language). It is possible that the blue color of the Ido flag was his proposal. He uttered the phrase: "It seems to me that both the Esperanto and Volapük poets are worthy only to be the objects of ridicule."

Bollack inspired H.G. Wells, who mentioned him in his book A Modern Utopia.

Works

Books

Bolak
La Langue Bleue Bolak: langue internationale pratique, Paris: 1899 (480+ pages).
Abridged grammar of the Blue Language [translated by Tischer], Paris: Pres. Dupont, 1900 (64 pages).
Premier vocabulaire de la langue bleue Bolak, Paris: 1902 (90+ pages).

Other
"Comment Et Pour Quoi La France Doit Renoncer A L'Alsace-Lorraine" (1905).
"La monnaie internationale" (La Revue, June 15, 1911). 
"Comment tuer la guerre - La loi mondiale de boycottage douanier". Paris, 1912. [Report presented to the legal committee of the 19th Universal Peace Congress (Geneva, September 1912) on economic sanctions.]
"L'emploi rationnel de la plume des oiseaux sauvages. Réglementation, oui; prohibition, non." Comite d’Ornithologie Economique, 1914.
"Vers La Fédération Mondiale", in Revue "Les Documents Du Progres" - Revue Internationale (arguing for a World Federation).

Articles
"La Langue Française en l'an 2003", by Leon Bollack, in La Revue, 15 July 1903.

References

Constructed language creators
1859 births
1925 deaths
French Jews